"Sin Querer Queriendo" (English: "Wanting Without Wanting") is a song by Argentine singer Lali featuring vocals from Venezuelan/Argentine duo Mau y Ricky, from her third studio album, Brava (2018). Written by Lali, Mau Montaner, Camilo Echeverry, Nano Novello, Luis Burgio, Peter Akselrad, and its producers, Ricky Montaner, Di Genius and Jon Leone, it was released by Sony Music Argentina as the album's fifth single on August 23, 2018. The song was later included in Mau y Ricky's debut album, Para Aventuras y Curiosidades (2019).

"Sin Querer Queriendo" won the award for "Song of the Year" at the 21st Annual Gardel Awards.

Background
"Sin Querer Queriendo" follows Lali's previous collaboration on Mau y Ricky's remix version of "Mi Mala", which also features Becky G, Leslie Grace and Karol G. Mau y Ricky named the song as "Mi Mala"'s little sister. Lyrically in the song, Lali regrets having made out with Mau y Ricky, claiming that she was lonely, though the duo claims that it seemed intentional.

Music Video
Directed by Diego Berakha, the accompanying music video for the single made its premiere on Vevo on August 23, 2018, after teasing it on the first show of Lali's Brava Tour. Lali and Berakha had previously worked together in the music video for "100 Grados". In the "colorful and minimalistic" video, Lali seduces Mau y Ricky, at the same time that they have fun. All three of them are seen wearing jean clothes, and Lali performs a dynamic choreography with four dancers.

On February 15, 2020, the music video reached 100 million views on YouTube. It became Lali's first music video to reach the milestone as lead artist, and second overall.

Live performances
Lali and Mau y Ricky first performed the song together at the first two shows of Lali's Brava Tour at the Luna Park Arena on August 23 and 24, 2018. On September 26, Lali performed the song on the Chilean television show Rojo, where she also performed "100 Grados". Lali and Mau y Ricky performed the song together at Univision's Countdown Feliz 2019 in Times Square, New York City, where they also performed their smash hit "Mi Mala (Remix)".

On May 12, 2019, Lali performed "Sin Querer Queriendo" as well as "100 Grados" and "Caliente" at the 6th Platino Awards.

Personnel
Credits adapted from Tidal.

 Lali Espósito – vocals, songwriting
 Ricky Montaner – vocals, songwriting, producer
 Di Genius – songwriting, producer
 Jon Leone – songwriting, producer
 Mau Montaner;– songwriting
 Luis Burgio – songwriting
 Gustavo Novelo;– songwriting, recording engineer
 Peter Akselrad;– songwriting
 Camilo Echeverry;– songwriting
 Antonella Giunta;– background vocals
 Stefania Romero;– background vocals

Charts

Weekly charts

Year-end charts

References

2018 singles
2018 songs
Lali Espósito songs
Sony Music singles
Songs written by Gustavo Novello
Songs written by Pablo Akselrad
Songs written by Lali Espósito
Songs written by Mau Montaner
Songs written by Camilo (singer)
Songs written by Ricardo Montaner